Inhibitor of growth protein 4 is a protein that in humans is encoded by the ING4 gene.

Function 

The protein encoded by this gene is similar to ING1, a tumor suppressor protein that can interact with TP53, inhibit cell growth, and induce apoptosis. This protein contains a PHD-finger, which is a common motif in proteins involved in chromatin remodeling. This protein can bind TP53 and EP300/p300, a component of the histone acetyl transferase complex, suggesting its involvement in the TP53-dependent regulatory pathway. Alternatively spliced transcript variants have been observed, but the biological validity of them has not been determined.

Interactions 

ING4 has been shown to interact with EP300, RELA and P53.

References

Further reading

External links 
 

Transcription factors